Väinö Kuisma (7 August 1934 – 18 February 2015) was a Finnish athlete. He competed in the men's javelin throw at the 1960 Summer Olympics.

References

1934 births
2015 deaths
Athletes (track and field) at the 1960 Summer Olympics
Finnish male javelin throwers
Olympic athletes of Finland
Athletes from Saint Petersburg